Federal Ombudsman Secretariat for Protection Against Harassment or Federal Ombudsman Secretariat for Protection Against Harassment At Workplace (FOSPAH) is an autonomous Quasi-judicial body working under the Act No-IV of 2010 and The Enforcement of Women's Property Rights Act, 2020, for the protection against harassment at the workplace, and also has jurisdiction of hearing the cases related to inheritance of women in the Pakistan. Kashmala Tariq is current Federal Ombudsman for Protection Against Harassment.

History 
FOSPAH was established in 2010.

References

External links 
 Official website

Ombudsmen in Pakistan